Hemorrhois is a genus of snakes in the family Colubridae.

Species
It contains the following four species:
 Hemorrhois algirus (Jan, 1863)
 Hemorrhois hippocrepis (Linnaeus, 1758), horseshoe whip snake
 Hemorrhois nummifer (Reuss, 1834)
 Hemorrhois ravergieri (Ménétries, 1832)

References

 
Colubrids
Snake genera
Taxa named by Heinrich Boie
Taxonomy articles created by Polbot